G&A might refer to:

 Selling, General and Administrative Expenses, an accounting concept
 George & Alana, a 90s television show
 Guns & Ammo, a magazine dedicated to firearms and related topics